A chloride nitride is a mixed anion compound containing both chloride (Cl−) and nitride ions (N3−). Another name is metallochloronitrides. They are a subclass of halide nitrides or pnictide halides.

The group 4 element chloride nitrides can be intercalated by alkali metals that supply extra electrons, and other molecules such as from solvents like tetrahydrofuran, yielding layered substances that are superconductors. A superconductor transition temperature Tc of 25.5K has been achieved.

Production 
Nitride chlorides may be produced by heating metal nitrides with metal chlorides. The ammonolysis process heats a metal chloride with ammonia. A related method heats a metal or metal hydride with ammonium chloride. The nitrogen source could also be an azide or an amide.

List

References 

Chlorides
Nitrides
Mixed anion compounds